In the World of Light is Tiki Taane's third studio album. Released in 2011, it is based upon electronica, involving numerous New Zealand Dubstep and Electronica artists.

Track listing
 Summertime feat. DubXL
 Soundtrack to Forever feat. Bulletproof
 Light Years Away feat. Crushington
 Nothing but Love feat. Truth
 La Bicha Dub feat. Bebe
 Light Years Away feat. Concord Dawn
 A Beautiful Mistake feat. Moana & The Tribe
 King of the Dubs
 Bloodstone feat. Hollie Smith & Uekaha Taane
 Come Fly with Me feat. Sambora
 Chico feat. Charlie Te Marama
 My Lion feat. Optimus Gryme
 Kaitiaki feat. Uekaha Taane
 In the World of Light

2011 albums
Tiki Taane albums